Hypotrabala is a genus of moths in the family Lasiocampidae. The genus was erected by William Jacob Holland in 1893.

Species
Some species of this genus are:
Hypotrabala castanea Holland, 1893
Hypotrabala odonestioides Berio, 1937
Hypotrabala regalis Tams, 1953
Hypotrabala regius (De Lajonquière, 1973)
Hypotrabala sanguicincta (Aurivillius, 1901)

References

Lasiocampidae